is the second single by the Japanese girl idol group Keyakizaka46. It was released in Japan on 10 August 2016 on the label Sony Records. The song was used as the theme song of their mystery and comedy drama  that premiered on TV Tokyo on 16 July 2016.

The center position in the choreography for the title song is held by Yurina Hirate.

The single was number-one on the Oricon Weekly Singles Chart, with 323,066 copies sold. It was also number-one on the Billboard Japan Hot 100.

Release 
It was released in 4 editions, Type-A, Type-B, Type-C and a regular edition. All editions, except the regular edition, include a DVD with music videos. Type-A includes Yurina Hirate's solo song Shibuya Kara Parco ga Kieta Hi.

Music video 
The choreography for the title track was created by Takahiro Ueno.

Track listings 
All lyrics written by Yasushi Akimoto.

Type-A

Type-B

Type-C

Regular Edition

Members

"Sekai ni wa Ai Shika Nai" 
Center: Yurina Hirate
 1st row: Manaka Shida, Rika Watanabe, Yurina Hirate, Risa Watanabe, Yui Imaizumi
 2nd row: Mizuho Habu, Neru Nagahama, Yūka Sugai, Akane Moriya, Miyu Suzumoto, Yui Kobayashi
 3rd row: Nana Oda, Fuyuka Saitō, Aoi Harada, Rina Uemura, Nanako Nagasawa, Minami Koike, Rika Ozeki, Nanami Yonetani, Shiori Satō, Nijika Ishimori

"Kataru Nara Mirai o..." 
 Nijika Ishimori, Yui Imaizumi, Rina Uemura, Rika Ozeki, Nana Oda, Minami Koike, Yui Kobayashi, Fuyuka Saitō, Shiori Satō, Manaka Shida, Yūka Sugai, Miyu Suzumoto, Nanako Nagasawa, Mizuho Habu, Aoi Harada, Yurina Hirate, Akane Moriya, Nanami Yonetani, Rika Watanabe, Risa Watanabe, Neru Nagahama

"Shibuya Kara Parco ga Kieta Hi" 
 Yurina Hirate

"Mata Atte Kudasai" 
 Neru Nagahama

"Aozora ga Chigau" 
 Manaka Shida, Yūka Sugai, Akane Moriya, Rika Watanabe, Risa Watanabe

"Bob Dylan wa Kaesanai" 
 Yui Imaizumi, Yui Kobayashi

"Hiragana Keyaki" 
 Mao Iguchi, Sarina Ushio, Memi Kakizaki, Yūka Kageyama, Shiho Katō, Kyōko Saitō, Kumi Sasaki, Mirei Sasaki, Mana Takase, Ayaka Takamoto, Neru Nagahama, Mei Higashimura

Chart and certifications

Weekly charts

Year-end charts

Certifications

References

Further reading

External links 
 Discography on the official website of Keyakizaka46
 List of videos included on the album's accompanying DVDs on YouTube

Keyakizaka46 songs
2016 singles
2016 songs
Songs with lyrics by Yasushi Akimoto
Sony Music Entertainment Japan singles
Oricon Weekly number-one singles
Billboard Japan Hot 100 number-one singles
Japanese television drama theme songs